Li Yueru (born 28 March 1999) is a Chinese basketball player for the Chicago Sky of the Women's National Basketball Association (WNBA) and for the Guangdong Dolphins of the Women's Chinese Basketball Association (WCBA) and the Chinese national team. Li was drafted in the third round of the 2019 WNBA Draft by the Atlanta Dream, but would not be eligible to play until 2020.

She participated at the 2017 FIBA Women's Asia Cup.

She is currently in the United States on the roster of WNBA team Chicago Sky.

Career statistics

WCBA

|-
| style="text-align:left;"| 2015–16
| style="text-align:left;"| Guangdong Dolphins
| 20 || 9 || 7.6 || .488 || .000 || .667 || 1.9 || 0.1 || 0.1 || 0.1 || 0.7 || 2.7
|-
| style="text-align:left;"| 2016–17
| style="text-align:left;"| Guangdong Dolphins
| 18 || 15 || 12.7 || .489 || 1.000 || .698 || 4.2 || 0.4 || 0.5 || 0.5 || 1.1 || 6.6
|-
| style="text-align:left;"| 2017–18
| style="text-align:left;"| Guangdong Dolphins
| 25 || 25 || 29.0 || .534 || .250 || .732 || 10.5 || 1.5 || 0.4 || 1.2 || 3.5 || 18.2
|-
| style="text-align:left;"| 2018–19
| style="text-align:left;"| Guangdong Dolphins
| 33 || 33 || 25.9 || .601 || .167 || .690 || 10.3 || 1.5 || 0.9 || 1.0 || 2.4 || 18.5
|- class="sortbottom"
| style="text-align:center;" colspan="2"| Career
| 96 || 82 || 20.4 || .565 || .211 || .707 || 7.5 || 1.0 || 0.5 || 0.8 || 2.1 || 13.1

Source: WCBA

WNBA

Regular season

|-
| align="left" | 2022
| align="left" | Chicago
| 16 || 0 || 5.1 || .444 || .000 || 1.000 || 1.5 || 0.1 || 0.1 || 0.1 || 0.8 || 1.8
|-
| align="left" | Career
| align="left" | 1 year, 1 team
| 16 || 0 || 5.1 || .444 || .000 || 1.000 || 1.5 || 0.1 || 0.1 || 0.1 || 0.8 || 1.8

References

External links

1999 births
Living people
Asian Games gold medalists for China
Asian Games medalists in basketball
Atlanta Dream draft picks
Basketball players at the 2018 Asian Games
Basketball players from Shanxi
Centers (basketball)
Chicago Sky players
Chinese women's basketball players
Guangdong Vermilion Birds players
Medalists at the 2018 Asian Games
People from Changzhi
Basketball players at the 2020 Summer Olympics
Olympic basketball players of China